The Big South Fork Scenic Railway is a heritage railroad in Stearns, Kentucky.

The route runs for 16 miles (26 km) through lush countryside in the Big South Fork National River and Recreation Area. There is a stop in the historic coal mining town of Blue Heron, Kentucky which can be toured. There is also a gift shop and snack bar with picnic shelter as well as hiking trails in Blue Heron.

The railroad is restoring a large 0-6-0 steam locomotive from the Union 
railroad built by ALCO in 1944 and uses diesel locomotives for its excursion trains.

The adjacent McCreary County Museum (admission included in train ticket) demonstrates life in Kentucky's coal company towns during the first half of the 20th century.

History
The line that is used by the BSFSR was originally laid down by the Stearns Coal & Lumber Company, beginning in 1901. In order to move lumber  from the Cumberland National Forest (now Daniel Boone National Forest), Stearns Company built the Kentucky & Tennessee Railroad. Shortly after opening up the lumber business, coal was discovered, and the company became Stearns Coal & Lumber. The first mine, at Barthell, was opened in 1902.

In 1904, the K&T changed their corporate charter name to the Kentucky & Tennessee Railway Company, in order to finance the extension of the line to Worley, White Oak Junction, Cooperative, and Bell Farm. Little K&T touched the Kentucky/Tennessee state line just south of Bell Farm. The line had graded roadbed to near Jamestown, Tennessee.

In 1937, Blue Heron Mining Camp was opened; K&T built a one-mile spur to the camp, crossing Roaring Paunch Creek. The bridge that was used to cross the creek was bought from New York Central Railroad (NYCRR) in 1936. K&T line builders needed a bridge to curve around to the right to meet the spur. The steel trestle was found in Upstate New York, shipped to Stearns, and installed upside down to meet the requirements. It is in use today, hauling passengers to Mine 18.

K&T had big plans to become a through trunk line railway. The Tennessee Central Railroad had a spur that ran into Monterey, Tennessee, where K&T hoped to meet them. Plans called for K&T and TC to meet in Monterey, Cookeville, Crab Orchard, and Harriman. They had intentions of using Southern Railway tracks into Chattanooga, but negotiations stalled with SR in 1951. In December 1963, the railroad purchased four ALCO S-2 diesel locomotives from the Denver and Rio Grande Western Railroad. The line's remaining steam locomotives remained on standby service until their official retirement in February 1964. Today, engines #10 and #12 (formerly Southern Railway 4501), (both 2-8-2 Mikakdos), are currently residing at the Tennessee Valley Railroad Museum in Chattanooga, Tennessee with #12 restored to operational condition with its original Southern Railway colors and number 4501 whilst #10 is awaiting restoration.

In 1974. Stearns opened up Justus Mine, which would technically be Mine 19. It was named in honor of the town's founder, Justus S. Stearns, and operated from 1974 until its closure by Blue Diamond Coal in October 1987.

The Big South Fork Scenic Railway started operating on July 1, 1982. The railway had 7 open-air passenger cars, all home built, and two ALCo S2 diesel switchers, Nos. 102 and 105. Number 102 was the second of four Alco switchers K&T purchased from the Denver & Rio Grande Western Railway in late 1963. Each unit spent two months in East St. Louis, Illinois, getting multiple unit controls installed.

Today, BSFSR is a thriving railway, pleasing tourists and railfans alike. Trains Magazine has said that the K&/BSFSR is a “spectacular trip back in time, when life was simple. The scenery is second to none and the hospitality of the citizens and staff is unmatched.”

Locomotives

These are the locomotives that ran on the Kentucky & Tennessee Railway.

See also

List of heritage railroads in the United States

References

External links
Big South Fork Scenic Railway Official Website
RailServe

Heritage railroads in Kentucky
Railroad museums in Kentucky
Museums in McCreary County, Kentucky
Transportation in McCreary County, Kentucky
1901 establishments in Kentucky
1901 in rail transport
Railway lines opened in 1901